Haddington may refer to:

Places
Haddington, East Lothian, Scotland
Haddington, Lincolnshire, England
Haddington, Philadelphia, United States
Haddington Range
Haddington Island (British Columbia)

Other
Haddington Burghs (UK Parliament constituency)
Earl of Haddington

See also 
 East Lothian formerly  referred to as Haddingtonshire